The Downtown Cody Historic District is the historic core of Cody, Wyoming, USA. "Historic" here refers to the early twentieth century, as Cody was not incorporated until 1901.  Most of the commercial district was built between 1901 and the 1930s. The district extends along Sheridan Avenue for two blocks, with buildings of brick and local sandstone with storefront display windows. The chief building in the district is the Irma Hotel, individually listed on the National Register of Historic Places.

The district extends between 1313 Sheridan to 1155 on the south side, and from 1286 to 1192 on the north side.

References

External links
Downtown Cody Historic District at the Wyoming State Historic Preservation Office

Commercial buildings on the National Register of Historic Places in Wyoming
Geography of Park County, Wyoming
Historic districts on the National Register of Historic Places in Wyoming
National Register of Historic Places in Park County, Wyoming